Lord of the Dance may refer to:

Personalities 
 Nataraja, Shiva in his dancing posture
 Lord of the Dance, a title given to Jesus Christ in some musical adaptations
 Rudolf Nureyev, ballet star, nicknamed Lord of the Dance

Literature 
 Lord of the Dance (novel), a 1984 novel by Father Andrew Greeley

Music 
 "Lord of the Dance" (hymn), a hymn written by Sydney Carter in 1963
 "Tomorrow Shall Be My Dancing Day", a traditional song that the "Lord of the Dance" hymn is based on
 Lord of the Dance (Franciscus Henri album) (1976)
 Lord of the Dance (musical), an Irish musical and dance production
 Lord of the Dance, an album composed by Ronan Hardiman for the above production
 A nickname for Michael Flatley, star of the above production
 "Lord of the Dance", a song by Steven Curtis Chapman from the album Signs of Life
 "Lord of the Dance", a song by Chris Clark from the album Clarence Park